Chlorizeina is a genus of grasshoppers in the subfamily Pyrgomorphinae.

References 

 Mao, B.Y. & Li, M. 2015: Two new species of grasshopper from China (Orthoptera: Pyrgomorphidae). Zoological systematics, 40(1), pages 63–69,

External links 

 
 Chlorizeina at orthoptera.speciesfile.org

Caelifera genera
Pyrgomorphidae
Taxa named by Carl Brunner von Wattenwyl